Leszno  (1800–1918 Lissa in Posen) is a historic city in western Poland, within the Greater Poland Voivodeship. It is the seventh-largest city in the province with an estimated population of 62,200, as of 2021. Previously, it was the capital of the Leszno Voivodeship (1975–1998) and is now the seat of Leszno County.

History

Early history
The city's unrecorded history dates to the 13th century. It was first mentioned in historical documents in 1393, when the estate was the property of a noble named Stefan Karnin-Wieniawa. The family eventually adopted the name Leszczyński (literal meaning "of Leszno"), derived from the name of their estate, as was the custom among the Polish nobility.

16th–18th centuries

In around 1516, a community of Protestants known as the Unity of the Brethren (Unitas fratrum) were expelled from the Bohemian lands by King Vladislaus II and settled in Leszno. They were invited by the Leszczyński family, imperial counts since 1473 and who had converted to Calvinism. The arrival of the Bohemian Protestants, in addition to weavers from nearby Silesia, helped the settlement to grow. 

In 1547 it became a town by a privilege according to Magdeburg Law granted by King Sigismund I of Poland. Leszno was a private town, administratively located in the Wschowa County in the Poznań Voivodeship in the Greater Poland Province of the Polish Crown. Leszno became the largest printing center in Greater Poland thanks to the activity of the Protestant community. Their numbers grew with the inflow of refugees from Silesia, Bohemia, and Moravia during the Thirty Years War. 

In 1631, Leszno was vested with further privileges by King Sigismund III Vasa, who made it equal with the most important cities of Poland such as Kraków, Gdańsk and Warsaw. By the 17th century, the town had a renowned Gymnasium (school), which was headed by Jan Amos Komenský (known in English as Comenius), an educator and the last bishop of the Unity of the Brethren. Johann Heermann, a German-speaking poet, lived in Leszno from 1638 until his death in 1647. Between 1636 and 1639, the town became fortified and its area increased.

The era of Leszno's prosperity and cultural prominence ended during the Second Northern War, when the town was burnt down on 28 April 1656 by Swedish forces. Quickly rebuilt afterwards, it was set on fire again during the Great Northern War by Russian forces in 1707 and was ravaged by plague in 1709. 

The Leszczyński family owned the city until 1738, when King Stanislaus I Leszczynski sold it to Alexander Joseph Sulkowski following his abdication. One of two main routes connecting Warsaw and Dresden ran through Leszno in the 18th century and Kings Augustus II the Strong and Augustus III of Poland often traveled that route.

19th–20th centuries

In the Second Partition of Poland in 1793, Leszno was annexed by the Kingdom of Prussia, within which it was referred to as Lissa. In 1807 it was taken by Napoleon's Grand Armee and included within the newly established but short-lived Polish Duchy of Warsaw. 

Following Napoleon's defeat in the Napoleonic Wars, in 1815 the town was reannexed by Prussia, initially as part of the semi-autonomous Grand Duchy of Posen. The town was subjected to Germanisation policies. In 1871 it became part of Germany, and in 1887, it became the administrative seat of the Prussian Kreis Lissa.

After World War I, in November 1918, Poland regained independence. Shortly after the Greater Poland Uprising of 1918–19 broke out, attempting to reintegrate Greater Poland and Leszno with Poland. The first local battles of the uprising took place in the area on December 28, 1918. Afterward the city became part of the newly established Second Polish Republic under the Treaty of Versailles, with effect from 17 January 1920. The local populace had to acquire Polish citizenship. In the interbellum, Leszno was a county seat within the Polish Poznań Voivodeship. In 1924, a monument dedicated to the Polish insurgents of 1918–19 was erected.

World War II

During the joint German-Soviet invasion of Poland, which started World War II in September 1939, the town was annexed by Nazi Germany and incorporated into Reichsgau Wartheland. The Germans carried out mass arrests of Poles accused of "anti-German activities". Attending church services and having private meetings in Polish households were considered suspect activities. A prison for Poles was established in the local monastery, where more than 200 people had already been imprisoned in September 1939 during the Intelligenzaktion. The Polish population was expelled to the General Government (German-occupied central Poland). 

Most of the town's Jewish population (which had included such notable rabbis as Leo Baeck and Jacob of Lissa, as well as the writer Ludwig Kalisch) and the remaining Poles were massacred by the Nazi Einsatzgruppen, which entered the town in September 1939. A notable public execution of 20 Poles, members of the "Sokół" Polish Gymnastic Society, former Polish insurgents of 1918–19, a local teacher, and a lawyer, was carried out in Leszno by the Einsatzgruppe VI on October 21, 1939. Poles who were initially imprisoned in Leszno were also murdered in nearby towns and villages of Poniec, Osieczna, Włoszakowice and Rydzyna. Poles from Leszno were also among the victims of the large Katyn massacre committed by the Russians in April–May 1940.

Already in late 1939, the Germans expelled over 1,000 Poles, including families of Poles murdered in various massacres, in addition also teachers, local officials, activists, former insurgents, and owners of shops and workshops, which were then handed over to German colonists as part of the Lebensraum policy. A transit camp for Poles expelled from various nearby settlements was established in the local school. Poles were held there several days, their money, valuables and food were confiscated, and then they were either deported to Tomaszów Mazowiecki or Łódź in German-occupied central Poland or sent to local German colonists or to Germany as slave labour.

Despite such circumstances, local Poles organized an underground resistance movement, which included the Ogniwo and Świt organizations, the secret youth organization Tajna Siódemka and structures of the Polish Underground State. The German occupation ended in 1945, and the town returned to Poland.

Post-war history
The pre-war monument of the Greater Poland insurgents was restored in 1957. The town underwent a period of fast development especially between 1975 and 1998 when it was a seat of a voivodeship administrative area. In 1991, a monument to the Constitution of 3 May 1791 and the heroes of the fights for Poland's independence was unveiled, and in 1995, a memorial to the victims of the Katyn massacre was unveiled. In 2000, the city was awarded "The Golden Star of Town Twinning" prize by the European Commission.

Climate 
Leszno has an oceanic climate (Köppen: Cfb) although notably with warm summer continental characteristics (Dfb), typical of inland west and south polish.

Sport

 Unia Leszno speedway club 
The Leszno motorcycle club was founded on May 8, 1938. The club was re-established May 2, 1946 after World War II. On July 28, 1949 the Leszno motorcycle club changed its name to Unia Leszno Speedway Club. Some rules and regulations were revised as well. The Unia Leszno has been a very successful club that has won many awards and medals throughout the years. The Unia Leszno Speedway Club has won over 78 different medals since the formation of the club.

 Leszno Aero Club
The Leszno Aero Club is the largest airfield in the Wielkopolska area. The Aero Club belongs to the Polish Aero Club central gliding school. The Aero Club in Leszno hosted the world gliding championship in 1958, 1969, and 2003. It is the only place that has done so. The Aero Club also has a pilot school called the Central Gliding school. The school has been around for over 50 years and was managed by pilot Irena Kempówna in the 1950s and 1960s.

 KS Polonia Leszno 
The Klub Sportowy Polonia Leszno was formed in 1912 in Leszno. It is an indoor soccer field. The first President of the club was Marcin Giera. The club did not gain much popularity until after World War II when official teams started playing there. Prior to World War I most of the people that played there were locals.

Education

Primary schools

 Szkoła Podstawowa Nr 1
 Szkoła Podstawowa Nr 2
 Szkoła Podstawowa Nr 3
 Szkoła Podstawowa Nr 4
 Szkoła Podstawowa Nr 5
 Zespół Szkół Specjalnych Nr 6
 Szkoła Podstawowa Nr 7
 Szkoła Podstawowa Nr 8
 Szkoła Podstawowa Nr 9
 Szkoła Podstawowa Nr 10
 Szkoła Podstawowa Nr 12
 Szkoła Podstawowa Nr 13

Secondary schools

 Liceum Ogólnokształcące Nr 1 (http://lo1.leszno.edu.pl/)
 Liceum Ogólnokształcące Nr 2 (http://www.iilo.leszno.pl/)
 Liceum Ogólnokształcące Nr 3
 Liceum Ogólnokształcące Nr 4
 Prywatne Liceum Ogólnokształcące
 Pierwsze Prywatne Liceum Ogólnokształcące w Lesznie

Technical schools

 Zespół Szkół Rolniczo-Budowlanych im. Synów Pułku
 Zespół Szkół Ekonomicznych im. Jana Amosa Komeńskiego (http://www.zse.leszno.pl)
 Zespół Szkół Technicznych im. 55 Poznańskiego Pułku Piechoty (http://www.zst-leszno.pl)
 Zespół Szkół Elektroniczno-Telekomunikacyjnych
 Zespół Szkół Ochrony Środowiska
 Zespół Szkół Specjalnych

Colleges

 Państwowa Wyższa Szkoła Zawodowa (https://web.archive.org/web/20040612150245/http://www.pwsz.edu.pl/)
 Wyższa Szkoła Humanistyczna
 Wyższa Szkoła Marketingu i Zarządzania (https://web.archive.org/web/20040609155530/http://www.wsmiz.edu.pl/)
 Nauczycielskie Kolegium Języków Obcych (http://www.nkjoleszno.pl/)
 AE w Poznaniu Ośrodek Studiów Wyższych w Lesznie

Notable people

 Stephan Born (1824–1898), German revolutionary
 Rafał Dobrucki (born 1976), Polish speedway rider
 Stanisław Grochowiak (1934–1976), Polish poet and dramatist
 Ludwig Kalisch (1814–1882), German-Jewish novelist
 Zvi Hirsch Kalischer (1795–1874); German Orthodox rabbi
 Jan Jonston (1603–1675), Reformed teacher and scholar, physician
 Leser Landshuth (1817–1887), German Jewish liturgiologist
 Jacob of Lissa (1760–1832), a rabbi
 Albert Mosse (1846–1925), German judge and legal schola
 Carl Friedrich Richard Förster (1825–1902), German ophthalmologist
 Otto Schultzen (1837–1875), German physician
 Ottomar Anschütz (1846–1907), German inventor, photographer and chronophotographer
 Paul Cinquevalli (1859–1918), German-British artist
 Albert Moll (1862–1939) German psychiatrist
 Leo Baeck (1873–1956), German-Jewish rabbi, scholar, and theologian
 Rudolf Leonhard (1889–1953), German author and communist activist
 Wolfgang Martini (1891–1963), German general
 Ludwig Schulz (1896–1966), Luftwaffe general 
 Gerhard Weisser (1898–1989) German social scientist 
 Johannes Eisermann (1900–1976), Wehrmacht officer 
 Wolfgang Thomale (1900–1978), German general
 Antoni Janusz (1902–2000), Polish sportsman and pilot
 Peter Lindbergh (1944–2019), German photographer and director
 Tomasz Parzy (born 1979), Polish footballer
 Krzysztof Kasprzak (born 1984), Polish speedway rider
 Alexandria Riordan (born 1990), Polish-American figure skater
 Ilse Schwidetzky (1907–1997), German anthropologist
 Haym Solomon (1740–1785), an important figure in the American Revolutionary War
 Daniel Strejc-Vetterus, Reformed printer and author of the oldest Polish guidebook of Iceland (1638)
 Carl Gottfried Woide (1725–1790), Reformed pastor, Orientalist and fellow of the British Royal Society

International relations

Twin towns – Sister cities
Leszno is twinned with:
  Montluçon, France
  Deurne, Netherlands
 Suhl, Germany
 Dunaújváros, Hungary

References

External links

 Official website of the City
 English guide to Leszno

 
Cities and towns in Greater Poland Voivodeship
Poznań Voivodeship (1921–1939)
City counties of Poland
Holocaust locations in Poland
Nazi war crimes in Poland